Kerry Bowman is a Canadian bioethicist and environmentalist based in Toronto, Ontario.

Career
Bowman holds an academic appointment with The University of Toronto in Family and Community Medicine and serves with The University of Toronto's School of the Environment. He has also worked with patients as a clinical bioethicist.

Bowman follows a range of bioethical issues, including end-of-life decision making, ethical questions in emerging technology, such as genomics, gene drive and  CRISPR-Cas9, cloning and reproductive ethics. He is also concerned with a variety of animal and environmental ethical questions, particularly emerging zoonotic diseases, tropical forest loss and de-extinction. 

Bowman's role as an ethicist informs the work he does as an environmentalist, which focuses primarily on the  interface of human cultures with conservation initiatives. He is presently working on major projects in both Eastern Congo and the Western Amazon both involving indigenous and local communities establishing stewardship over their forests.  Bowman has done extensive fieldwork with a range of species; including  all four great ape species in both Indonesia and Central Africa. He has observed in their natural habitat the Sumatran rhinoceros (Aceh, Sumatra, Indonesia, 1981), the Bactrian camel (Gashun Gobi Desert, western China, 2012), the Javan rhino (Ujung Kulon National Park, Java, Indonesia, 2013), as well as all species of big cats, including the snow leopard (Hemis National Park, Ladakh region, India, 2015).

A former member of the board of directors for the Jane Goodall Institute of Canada, Bowman is an ethics consultant to Jane Goodall Institute Global and the founding president of the Forest Health Alliance (formerly called Canadian Great Ape Alliance). With the original goal of saving the great apes from extinction through a direct Congolese partnership, this organization operates and oversees projects in the Eastern Democratic Republic of Congo (DRC) that are designed to reflect local cultures, as well as economic and political realities. This includes the Great Ape Habitat Connectivity Project, which has been developing a habitat corridor for the eastern lowland gorilla and eastern chimpanzees to promote gene flow and reduce deforestation.

Bowman established the Kahuzi-Biega Environmental School in the Eastern Democratic Republic of Congo in 2003. The initiative was designed to give young students an opportunity to acquire a basic education as well as an understanding of their role in environmental and wildlife conservation. "There's absolutely no way of protecting the environment without working with local people and enriching and protecting human communities", Bowman told reporters at a 2011 press conference.

Bowman was featured in a 2002 Discovery Channel documentary called "Bushmeat," which traced the path of the illicit bushmeat trade from the Congo Basin to an underground meat market in Cameroon and beyond, and in "The Ghosts of Lomako", a 2003 Nature of Things documentary in which Bowman traveled to the Democratic Republic of Congo to study the endangered bonobo ape. He also appeared in "Gorilla Doctors" (2014), a CBC The Nature of Things documentary focusing on the protection of mountain gorillas in  Virunga, Democratic Republic of Congo and Rwanda. He is presently working on two more documentaries.

United Nations
Bowman is currently working with Office for The Coordination of Humanitarian Affairs (OCHA) on an approach called Anticipatory Action, a set of actions taken to prevent or mitigate potential humanitarian disasters before acute impacts are felt. Through on-site fieldwork in fragile states, he is exploring both the ethics of this as well as many of the social, cultural and qualitative realities associated with such interventions.

Bowman previously served with United Nations Environment Programme (UNEP), as author with the fourth Global Environment Outlook (GEO-4) in 2007 and as a contributing author and expert reviewer with GEO-5 in 2012. He was also involved in Global Environment Outlook 6, examining the connection between human health and the environment.

North Korea
Since 2010, Bowman has joined a number of international delegations to North Korea (DPRK) that focused on environmental improvement and youth environmental education in relation to environmentally improved agricultural and environmental practice. "What is remarkable," Bowman notes, "is that DPRK may be the only country in the world that has adopted organic, sustainable agriculture as a national policy".

The Western Amazon

Bowman has recently turned his attention to the relationship between the protection of indigenous land and its environmental/climatic benefits, as well as the negative climatic impacts of environmental degradation in the Amazon rainforest. Says Bowman: "The Indigenous peoples of the Amazon and the world are one of our best hopes to protect our forests, secure biodiversity and slow the environmental calamity we are facing."
This work has brought him into the range of some of the world's last remaining isolated and uncontacted indigenous communities. Although never seeking to make contact, he is one of the few Canadian researchers to have actually seen uncontacted people, and has spent time with indigenous groups of the western Amazon, including those only just recently contacted by the outside world. His work has included remote regions of Papua New Guinea, as well as into the eastern Congo's Ituri rainforest, where he cohabited among the Mbuti pygmies.

References

External links
 Forest Health Alliance 
 University of Toronto Joint Centre for Bioethics 

Academic staff of the University of Toronto
Canadian conservationists
Living people
Year of birth missing (living people)